Mitchell Mulhern (born 22 January 1991) is an Australian professional racing cyclist. He rode at the 2015 UCI Track Cycling World Championships.

References

External links

1991 births
Living people
Australian male cyclists
Place of birth missing (living people)
20th-century Australian people
21st-century Australian people